Gerald Thomas Walsh (born April 25, 1942) is an American prelate of the Roman Catholic Church who served as an auxiliary bishop and vicar general of the Archdiocese of New York. He was rector of St. Joseph's Seminary in Yonkers, New York, from 2007 to 2013.

Biography

Early life 
Gerald Walsh was born on April 25, 1942, in Manhattan, the eldest of the three children of Thomas Walsh, a police officer, and Anne (née Haggerty) Walsh, a homemaker.  His siblings are Michael (b. 1944) and Monica (b. 1950).  Gerald Walsh attended Good Shepherd School and Power Memorial Academy in New York City, then Iona College in New Rochelle, New York in 1959; there he earned the nickname of "St. Gerry" from his classmates. Walsh then attended St. Joseph's Seminary in Yonkers, New York, where he obtained his bachelor's degree and his Master of Divinity Degree.

Priesthood 
Walsh was ordained to the priesthood for the Archdiocese of New York by Cardinal Francis Spellman on May 27, 1967, in St. Patrick's Cathedral in Manhattan. Walsh then studied Spanish at the Institute for Intercultural Communication of the Pontifical Catholic University of Puerto Rico in Ponce, Puerto Rico. 

After returning to New York, Walsh served as parochial vicar of Holy Trinity Parish in Manhattan until 1980.  He received his Master of Social Work degree from Fordham University in New York City in 1983. Also in 1980, Walsh was appointed head of the Department of Family and Children's Services at Catholic Charities, holding that position until 1989.  He was raised by the Vatican to the rank of mkonsignor in 1990. For the next six years, he was pastor of Incarnation Parish in Washington Heights, Manhattan.

From January 1996 to August 1998, Walsh served as private secretary to Cardinal John O'Connor. During this time, he accompanied O'Connor on ten trips to Rome, where he met Pope John Paul II. Walsh later reflected on his time as O'Connor's secretary by saying, "I learned a lot of things I would not have known otherwise, how to handle certain situations". Walsh was then named pastor of St. Elizabeth's Parish in Washington Heights, and regional vicar of North Manhattan in September of that same year. In 2003, Walsh was named vicar of development of the archdiocese, serving as its chief fundraiser.

Auxiliary Bishop of New York 
On June 28, 2004, Walsh was appointed as an auxiliary bishop of the Archdiocese of New York and Titular Bishop of Altiburus by  John Paul II. He received his episcopal consecration on September 21, 2004, from Cardinal Edward Egan, with Bishops Robert Brucato and Patrick Sheridan serving as co-consecrators.  Walsh chose as his episcopal motto: "That All May Be One" (John 17:21). He explained his motto as a call to "unite around the teacher," for "the role of a bishop is to be a teacher, one who teaches primarily by example". In 2007, he was named rector of St. Joseph's Seminary. He was the only bishop to serve as the head of an American seminary.

Walsh has also served as associate chaplain of the Knights of Columbus' New York chapter since 1980, and was a member of the archdiocesan Priests' Council and College of Consultors starting in 2000. On February 13, 2013, Walsh was named vicar general of the archdiocese, holding that position until 2014.

Retirement 
On September 5, 2017 Pope Francis accepted Walsh's letter of resignation as auxiliary bishop of the Archdiocese of New York after he reached the mandatory retirement age of 75.

Walsh enjoys playing handball, at least until receiving a knee injury, and taking walks in the community.

See also
 

 Catholic Church hierarchy
 Catholic Church in the United States
 Historical list of the Catholic bishops of the United States
 List of Catholic bishops of the United States
 Lists of patriarchs, archbishops, and bishops

References

External links

 Roman Catholic Archdiocese of New York Official Site

Episcopal succession

1942 births
Living people
21st-century American Roman Catholic titular bishops
People from Manhattan
Saint Joseph's Seminary (Dunwoodie) alumni
Iona University alumni
Fordham Graduate School of Social Service alumni
Catholics from New York (state)